Malangutti Sar is a mountain in the Karakoram mountains with a height of 7,207 metres (23,645 feet). It is the 104th tallest mountain on Earth and located in the Shimshal Valley of the Hunza District of Gilgit-Baltistan.

References

External links
 Mulungutti Sar, Pakistan on Peakbagger 

Mountains of Gilgit-Baltistan
Seven-thousanders of the Karakoram